The Madagascan Rugby Federation is the governing body for rugby union in Madagascar. It is a member of the Confederation of African Rugby (CAR) and a member of the International Rugby Board.

See also
 Rugby union in Madagascar
 Madagascar national rugby union team
 Madagascar national rugby sevens team
 Madagascar women's national rugby sevens team

References

Rugby union governing bodies in Africa
Rugby union in Madagascar